WNSR (560 AM) is a Nashville-area Class D radio station operating on the AM frequency of 560 kHz. WNSR's majority owner is Randolph Victor Bell, and the station's general manager is former WSM personality Ted Johnson.

The station broadcasts a mixture of local and national sports events and local and national sports talk shows. It once served as the "backup" affiliate of the Nashville Predators NHL team, originating their games when the then-primary affiliate, WGFX-FM, had a conflicting commitment to the Vanderbilt University sports network. The station was also the former home of Nashville Sounds baseball, Nashville Metros soccer, Vanderbilt Commodores football games, and Vanderbilt Commodores men's basketball games. WNSR is currently the home of Vanderbilt women's basketball games and Vanderbilt baseball games. The station broadcasts Major League Baseball games as a member of the Atlanta Braves Radio Network.

History
The station converted to its current format in 1996, with the call letters WYOR (later WHEW), when all-sports programming began its meteoric rise in the North American radio market, particularly on AM stations. It was previously affiliated with ESPN Radio; however, in 2005, ESPN moved its affiliation to WNFN (then WNPL), an FM station. WNSR is currently affiliated with CBS Sports Radio. Many of the top names in Nashville sports have worked at WNSR. Greg Pogue, who is a veteran sports writer, sports editor, and television host, hosted Nashville's longest running morning sports show with David Coleman. Pogue worked with the Nashville Banner and was later sports editor at the Daily News Journal. Pogue took over the morning drive slot after Patrick McMurtry left to take a television news anchor position in Charleston, West Virginia. Darren McFarland, a radio veteran in Nashville, hosted a show during two different stints at the station. Brad Hopkins, a former Tennessee Titan, hosted two different shows, the latter as a co-host alongside McFarland. Bill King, a national sports talk show host and recruiting expert, hosted a show with Joe Biddle, a sports writer with the former Nashville Banner and later The Tennessean. Gregory Ruff, a veteran broadcaster in Nashville, worked in various roles with the station hosting a show and later being the fill-in for many of the shows. Jonathan Shaffer has also worked at the station. Chip Ramsey was one of the early broadcasters who did a show. Mike Wolf had an eclectic program at one point. Don West hosted an afternoon radio show that featured various other co-hosts including David Boclair, Eric Yutzy, Steve Wrigley, and Paul Kuharsky. (West was also a popular shopping channel show host and later announcer for TNA Wrestling.)  Long-time Nashville sports broadcasting figure George Plaster joined the station's staff in September 2019.

Listening area
WNSR is licensed to the Nashville suburb of Brentwood, Tennessee in adjoining Williamson County. Its 4,500-watt daytime signal is transmitted from a four-tower antenna in eastern Williamson County in a north-northeast/south-southeast directional pattern; this is due in part to the 5,000-watt daytime signal of a much older Class B 560 kHz station, WHBQ, just under 200 airline miles away in Memphis. As a result, WNSR's signal can be very difficult to receive in Nashville's eastern and especially western suburbs, but the station can be heard clearly from as far away as South Central Kentucky and North Alabama between sunrise and sunset. At night, when WHBQ has a 1,000-watt signal, WNSR broadcasts at an even more limited level of power (75 watts) from a nondirectional, one-tower antenna just southeast of downtown Nashville. Thus, the station's nighttime signal does not fully encompass the entire metropolitan area.

However, the listening area has been effectively enlarged by the purchase of WRFM (formerly WNTC and WPDQ), a Class A FM station licensed to Drakesboro, Kentucky, considerably north of the traditional Nashville market area, which now simulcasts WNSR programming, putting it into the Clarksville/Hopkinsville market area.

In addition, the station also signed on over translator station W240CA (95.9 FM), which serves the Nashville/Davidson County area and the Williamson County area, including the Brentwood, Franklin, and some parts of Spring Hill, Tennessee areas.

Programming
WNSR currently is in affiliation with CBS Sports Radio. The station was previously affiliated with Yahoo! Sports Radio (formerly Sporting News Radio, and Sports Fan Radio Network prior to that) and NBC Sports Radio. The NBC Sports Radio affiliation has since relocated to WQZQ. The station also broadcasts local sports, both talk shows and play-by-play as well.

On July 31, 2009, it was announced that WNSR would broadcast Middle Tennessee State University football and men's basketball games.  This affiliation began with the start of the 2009 football season. However, the affiliation with 
Middle Tennessee State University ended when the school moved their sports coverage to WPRT-FM, beginning with the 2013 football season. WNSR now serves as the primary affiliate for Vanderbilt University baseball and women's basketball programs.

See also
List of Nashville media

External links
WNSR official website

NSR
Sports in Nashville, Tennessee
Sports radio stations in the United States
CBS Sports Radio stations
Radio stations established in 1985
1985 establishments in Tennessee